Space Music is the third album of Brazilian composer Eloy Fritsch.

AllMusic's Cesar Lanzarini noted the similarities to other keyboard players such as Yanni, Isao Tomita and Jan Hammer, and said that Fritsch's music "captures emotional experience and transforms it through upbeat and melodic compositions".

Track listing
"Beyond the Galaxy" – 2:51
"Time to Fly – Part One" – 3:34
"Dawn over the Planet" – 7:08
"Gate to Infinity"  – 4:21
"Starlight" – 4:22
"Sonic Attack"  – 8:33
"Microcosmos" – 4:11
"Dances with Dolphins"  – 4:18
"Journey to the Unknown" – 4:00
"Time to Fly – Part Two" – 3:51

References

1998 albums
Eloy Fritsch albums